The Klydonograph is a device that records a surge in electrical voltage on a sulphur-dusted photographic film. The device is credited to John F. Peters, who pursued the idea as a means of investigating the effects of lightning on electric power lines. The resulting graphic varies in size and shape as a function of the potential, polarity, and wave shape of the captured lightning discharge.

Imaging an electrical impulse with sulphur dust was documented in 1777 by Dr. G. C Lichtenberg, and this idea was further developed by others (to include a photographic plate), for example before being adopted by the Klydonograph.

Klydonograph is generally used to record impulse voltages between 2 kV and 50 kV.

References

Lightning